Matt or Matthew Flynn may refer to:

 Matt Flynn (born 1985), American football player
 Matt Flynn (Australian footballer) (born 1997), Australian rules footballer for Greater Western Sydney
 Matt Flynn (politician) (born 1947), American politician
 Matt Flynn (musician) (born 1970), American musician
 Matthew Flynn (born 1989), English footballer